Bern Weissenbühl railway station is a railway station in the Swiss canton of Bern and city of Bern. It serves, and derives its name from, the  quarter of that city. It is located on Bern's "Südbahnhofstrasse" (south station street). The station is on the Gürbetal line and is operated by BLS AG.

Services 
The following services stop at Bern Weissenbühl:

 Bern S-Bahn:
 : rush-hour service between Biel/Bienne and Belp.

References

External links 
 
 

Railway stations in the canton of Bern
BLS railway stations